Jonathan Hurst (born October 20, 1966 in New York City, USA) is a former professional baseball pitcher who played for the Montreal Expos (1992) and New York Mets (1994) of Major League Baseball (MLB). He's been the pitching coach of New York Mets minor league affiliates since 2006.

Career

Early life and draft
Prior to playing professionally, Hurst attended Spartanburg High School in Spartanburg, South Carolina and then Spartanburg Methodist College. He was drafted three times by major league teams: in 1986, he was selected by the Seattle Mariners in the ninth round of the January draft, however he opted not to sign. That same year, he was drafted by the Cincinnati Reds in the second round of the June Secondary draft, however he once again did not sign. In 1987, he was taken in the fourth round of the 1987 regular draft by the Texas Rangers and did sign.

On July 21, 1991, he was traded by the Rangers with a player to be named later (minor league pitcher Travis Buckley, who was sent on September 1, 1991) and Joey Eischen to the Expos for Oil Can Boyd.

Major league career
Hurst made his major league debut on June 9, 1992 for the Montreal Expos at the age of 25. He made three starts for the Expos in his first big league season, going 1–1 with a 5.51 ERA. In 16 1/3 innings, he allowed 18 hits, walked seven batters and struck out four.

He pitched in the Expos organization until 1993, when he was selected off waivers by the Los Angeles Dodgers on June 2. He was released by the Dodgers following the season and was signed by the Mets on December 16.

He pitched in seven games for the Mets in 1994, going 0–1 with a 12.60 ERA. He allowed 15 hits in 10 innings, while striking out six batters and walking five. He played his final major league game on April 21, 1994.

Overall, he went 1–2 with an 8.20 ERA in 10 games (three starts).

Minor league career
Hurst pitched in the minor leagues from 1987 to 1994 and again in 1998, going 51–38 with a 3.63 ERA in 206 games (110 starts). He pitched in the Rangers' (1987–1991, 1998), Expos' (1991–1993), Dodgers' (1993) and Mets' (1994) organizations.

He showed some flashes of excellence throughout his minor league career. For example, he went 4–3 with a 1.88 ERA and 59 strikeouts in 57 1/3 innings in his very first professional season, spent with the GCL Rangers. The following year, he went 2–0 with a 1.64 ERA in 13 games (four starts), as he struck out 35 batters in 33 innings for three teams. In 1991, he went 15–3 with a 2.27 ERA in 26 games (23 starts).

Prior to the 1992 season, he was ranked by Baseball America as the 91st best prospect in all of baseball.

Yakult Swallows
Hurst pitched for the Yakult Swallows in 2001, going 1–1 with a 5.97 ERA in 22 games (two starts). In 34 2/3 innings, he allowed 43 hits, while walking 11 batters and striking out 13.

Brother Elephants
He also pitched for the Brother Elephants of the Chinese Professional Baseball League and in the Mexican League.

Post-playing career
Hurst has been a pitching coach in the minor leagues since 2006. In 2006, he worked for the GCL Mets. He was with the Savannah Sand Gnats in 2007 and 2008, from 2009 to 2015 he coached for the Kingsport Mets, and in 2016 he began coaching for the Columbia Fireflies, the Mets Single A South Atlantic League affiliate in Columbia, South Carolina.

References

External links

1966 births
Living people
Albuquerque Dukes players
American expatriate baseball players in Canada
American expatriate baseball players in Japan
American expatriate baseball players in Mexico
American expatriate baseball players in Taiwan
Brother Elephants players
Charlotte Rangers players
Charros de Jalisco players
Gastonia Rangers players
Gulf Coast Rangers players
Harrisburg Senators players
Indianapolis Indians players
Major League Baseball pitchers
Mercuries Tigers players
Mexican League baseball pitchers
Miami Miracle players
Montreal Expos players
New York Mets players
Nippon Professional Baseball pitchers
Norfolk Tides players
Oklahoma City 89ers players
Oklahoma RedHawks players
Ottawa Lynx players
Rieleros de Aguascalientes players
Saraperos de Saltillo players
Spartanburg Methodist Pioneers baseball players
Baseball players from New York City
Sultanes de Monterrey players
Tulsa Drillers players
Yakult Swallows players
African-American baseball players